The Korean Biology Olympiad (KBO) is a biology olympiad held by Korean Biology Educational Society. The top four finalists become eligible to join the International Biology Olympiad.

See also

 List of biology awards

References

Biology awards
Education competitions in South Korea